Chitralekha is a weekly news magazine published in Gujarati and Marathi.

History and profile
Chitralekha'''s first issue was published in 1950, under the editorship of Vaju Kotak. The magazine is part of the Chitralekha Group from Mumbai, Maharashtra, India. It is jointly published by Chitralekha and #BANNER1 & # Group.

It has given rise to many prominent Gujarati columnists including Kanti Bhatt, Chandrakant Bakshi, Taarak Mehta, and others. After the death of founding editor Vaju Kotak in 1959, Madhuri Kotak took charge of the magazine along with Harkisan Mehta, who edited it till 1998.

The Chitralekha Group publishes several other magazines, including Watch World (a niche magazine focused on Watches) and BTW (By The Way - a lifestyle magazine circulated with Chitralekha Gujarati).

A US edition of Chitralekha was launched in 2006 and was based in Maryland.

On 20 April 2011, the Indian Postal Service issued a Rs. 5 commemorative postage stamp honouring Chitralekha''.

References

External links
 Official website

1950 establishments in Bombay State
Gujarati-language magazines
News magazines published in India
Weekly magazines published in India
Magazines established in 1950
Mass media in Mumbai